Manor Downs was a horse racetrack located outside Manor, Texas, United States.  It was Texas' oldest pari-mutuel horse racetrack.  Live racing in the spring featured both quarter horse and thoroughbred racing.  Simulcast racing was also available.

They initially planned for Manor Downs to be a horse-training stable and fairground facility.

Manor Downs originally hosted just quarter-horse racing; but when pari-mutuel betting was legalized, the track was later upgraded for thoroughbred racing in order to qualify for a pari-mutuel license.

Manor Downs was licensed as a class 2 racetrack in Texas. A class 2 racetrack is a racetrack on which racing is conducted for no more than 44 days in a calendar year.

Manor Downs has also been the site for concerts through the years including Farm Aid 2 and the Grateful Dead.

As horse racing's popularity waned with the slow economy of the Great Recession, Manor Downs ceased operations in late July 2010 rather than continue losing money.

Racing
The following graded stakes were run at Manor Downs:
Grade I  Manor Downs Futurity  $300,000
Grade II  Longhorn Futurity  $200,000
Grade II  Manor Downs Derby $145,540
Grade III  Longhorn Derby  $121,560

External links 
Manor Downs

Defunct sports venues in Texas
Buildings and structures in Travis County, Texas
Defunct horse racing venues in the United States